Morph is a British series of clay stop-motion comedy animations, named after the main character, who is a small Plasticine man, who speaks an unintelligible language and lives on a tabletop, his bedroom being a small wooden box.  The character was initially seen interacting with Tony Hart, beginning in 1977, on several of his British television programmes, notably Take Hart and Hartbeat.

History
Morph was produced for the BBC by Aardman Animations, later famous for the "Sledgehammer" music video, Wallace and Gromit, and Shaun the Sheep.  Morph appears mainly in one-minute "shorts" interspersed throughout the Take Hart show.  These are connected to the main show by having Hart deliver a line or two to Morph, who replies in gobbledygook but with meaningful gestures.  Later on, Morph is joined by cream-coloured Chas, who is much more troublesome and mischievous.

Morph can change shape.  He becomes spheres in order to move around and extrudes into cylinders to pass to different levels of his environment.  He can also mimic other objects or creatures.  Morph lives in a wooden microscope box on an artist's desk.  He and Chas both love to eat cake, as seen in many of the shorts.  Most appearances of Morph revolve around his friendship and rivalry with Chas, with each often playing tricks on the other and laughing at each other's misfortune.  While Morph's nature is that of an innocent, curious character, Chas is much more mischievous and prone to bad behaviour.

After Hart's shows ended, Morph and Chas appeared in shorts on the Children's BBC's successor programme SMart from 1994 onwards.

Some of the early plasticine models of Morph were destroyed in a fire at the warehouse where they were being stored on 10 October 2005.

Morph's 30th birthday was celebrated in 2007 by creator Peter Lord and celebrity fan and comedian Phill Jupitus at events for the Encounters Film Festival in Bristol. In March 2009, shortly after Hart's death, a flashmob of Morph characters was organised in London outside the Tate Modern art gallery.

In 2009, the BBC drama Ashes to Ashes featured Morph in a guest appearance as a representation of a present-day medic.  Morph was used to give a comic feeling despite a very serious situation in episode 3 of the second series.  The character was pictured in an episode of Take Hart; however, Morph appeared on the television after it was turned off, separating it from the context of the Take Hart episode.

On 29 October 2013, Peter Lord (co-founder of Aardman Animations), created a fundraising project on the crowdfunding site Kickstarter.  The campaign set a target of £75,000 to be used to fund 12 new one-minute episodes.  The target was reached on 6 November 2013 after only nine days, attracting contributions from over 1,700 backers, who received a variety of rewards, including early access to the new animations and a small box of clay used in the production, depending on the individual's level of funding.  In January 2014, Peter Lord and Aardman began production on 15 new episodes featuring Morph.  The new series premiered on Morph's official YouTube channel with 15 episodes from 4 July 2014 to 30 January 2015.

In 2015, a Morph experience opened at Land's End.  The Land's End signpost was rebranded "Lamb's End" with original sets, models, and characters from a range of Aardman productions.  Visitors were also able to star in a real Shaun the Sheep scene, using green screen technology, and meet other characters from the Aardman family, including Shaun the Sheep and Wallace & Gromit.

Released between 20 March and 2 October 2015, HD-restored versions of The Amazing Adventures of Morph appeared on YouTube; and in the summer of 2015, Morph returned to TV on CBBC with the 15 new episodes.  From 6 November 2015 to 7 January 2016, The Lost Tapes from 2001 were revealed having been redubbed and remastered on YouTube.  In March 2016, it was announced that Sky had made a deal with Aardman Animations to produce new Morph material to be directed at its child audience.  From 6 May 2016 to 15 September 2017, all clips captured from Take Hart were revealed on the Morph YouTube channel.  In August 2017, new Morph merchandise was shown at Wallace & Gromit's Charity Shop.  Between 2 March and 14 September 2018, 15 more episodes of the new Morph series that were previously shown on Sky Kids were shown on YouTube.  From 15 February to 17 May 2019, all 13 episodes of The Morph Files that were remastered into HD were released on YouTube.

In May 2019, Morph and Chas appeared in an advert for Tesco as part of the company's centenary celebrations, which also featured celebrities Anneka Rice and Derrick Evans (the latter more commonly known as Mr. Motivator).

On 9 November 2020, the new Morph series, The Epic Adventures of Morph, appeared and began to stream on Sky Kids.  The series features Morph, Chas, and two old characters—Delilah and GrandMorph—who were brought back to add more life to the show.  There is also a very small cameo from Gillespie, who is another character from The Morph Files and The Amazing Adventures of Morph that was revived for the series.

Films, shorts, and TV series

Series overview

Original episodes (2006, 2013–2015)
The original 44 episodes of Morph were originally produced on the Aardman website back in 2006, and were re-used on Aardman's YouTube channel by around September 2008 until 2010, and Morph's YouTube channel from 4 November 2013 until 23 October 2015.
The original episodes uses the same clips originally used from Take Hart, Hartbeat, SMart and The Morph Files.

Series 1: 2014–2015
The first series of the then-named Brand New Morph was released on YouTube from 4 July 2014 to 30 January 2015 with a Red Nose Day special being released on 6 March. The first series was also aired on CBBC throughout the summer of 2015.

Series 2: 2018
The 2nd series of Brand New Morph was released to YouTube from 2 March 2018 until 14 September 2018, it is the first series being produced for Sky Kids, which streamed the first 2 series of Morph on Sky TV.

Series 3: 2021
The third series of Brand New Morph made its way to YouTube on 12 February 2021 until 31 December 2021, with the episodes taking place during some special events that occurred during the year.
All of the episodes were produced during production for the 2nd series in 2018, 3 years before it was officially shown in 2021.

Series 4: 2022
The fourth series of Brand New Morph (now titled: 'The Epic Adventures of Morph) made its way to YouTube on 1 April 2022 until 8 July 2022, with the episodes' running time now extended to five minutes. Delilah and Grandmorph made their return to the series as main characters also. The Very Small Creatures still appeared from time to time and Gillespie made a cameo in 'Beanstalk.'
All of the episodes were produced in 2020, 2 years before it was officially shown in 2022.

Characters

Main

Morph – The protagonist with terracotta skin. He is a clay figure who can transform into many things. He is very clever, curious and creative, and has a good sense of humour. 
Chas – Morph's white-skinned best friend. He is amoral, narcissistic, and dimwitted but has a good friendship with Morph, although this doesn’t stop him playing tricks on him at times. Chas was originally named Stu.
Nailbrush – Morph's 'canine' companion, a barking, male nailbrush. He is very loyal to Morph, although he sometimes gets him into trouble.

Supporting
Grandmorph – Morph's elderly, bearded grandfather, who travels by skateboard and frequently invents things. Although wise and kind-hearted, Grandmorph is very strict, and often punishes Morph and Chas when they misbehave.
Delilah – A bossy, bespectacled female character in a yellow dress with dark brownish-purple skin. She has a good relationship with Morph. 
Folly – A scatter-brained girl made of tin-foil. 
Gillespie – A large, blue friend of Morph's. He is very clueless and silly but is peaceable and often meditates.
The Very Small Creatures – An array of small plasticine balls with eyes who travel in a swarm; the smallest of the group, Little Green, features prominently on his own in a number of episodes.
Gobbledygook – A green, omnivorous alien child (who arrived on the table by sleeping near Morph's box in The Amazing Adventures of Morph, but in The Morph Files, he arrived by mistakenly being printed from a 'Space Invaders' style game).
The Paint Pots – A group of sentient paint pots who can morph their paint into facsimiles of people; unlike Morph and Chas, they are able to speak coherently (one of them even chides Morph for his non-existent linguistic skills on multiple occasions); they only appear in Take Hart.
Luxo the Lamp – A Luxo lamp who warns the others when Tony is entering the room; like the Paint Pots, it only appears in Take Hart, but later reappeared in a 2018 short in a silent role more akin to Luxo Jr.

See also
Gumby
Davey and Goliath
Pingu
Wallace and Gromit
Shaun the Sheep
Creature Comforts
Cartoon Network (Japan)
Pogo (TV channel)

References

External links
Official Morph website
Official Morph YouTube channel
Information about Morph, with photograph
B3ta interview with Tony Hart which discusses Morph
A fond farewell to Morph: Tony Hart article about Morph
Animation archive up in smoke: BBC News article about Aardman's warehouse fire
Morph's page on Tony Hart's official site
Limited edition Morph prints created for Morph's 30th anniversary
Guardian article about Aardman's warehouse fire
Kickstarter project to fund new production

Television characters introduced in 1977
Stop motion characters
Fictional shapeshifters
Aardman Animations
Cartoon mascots
Male characters in animated series

no:Morph